Kolondiéba Cercle is an administrative subdivision of the Sikasso Region of Mali. The administrative center (chef-lieu) is the town of Kolondiéba.

The cercle is divided into the urban commune of Kolondiéba and 11 rural communes:

References

Cercles of Mali
Sikasso Region